A Gift of Love is a 2015 compilation album of ballads recorded by Bette Midler from 1976 to 2014. It was released on December 4, 2015 and reached number 46 on the charts in Australia and number 25 in the UK.

Track listing

Charts

Certifications and sales

References

Bette Midler compilation albums
2015 greatest hits albums
Rhino Entertainment compilation albums